Feng Danyu (born 1962) is a vice admiral (zhongjiang) in the People's Liberation Army Navy (PLAN) of China. He has been deputy commander of the People's Liberation Army Navy since August 2017, and formerly served as deputy head of the Department of Equipment Development of the Central Military Commission.

Family
His grandfather, Feng Yuxiang (1882–1948), was a warlord who led the Guominjun faction during the Republican era. He has a sister, Feng Danlong, director of China Affairs Department of Pfizer. He attained the rank of rear admiral (shaojiang) in July 2005, and was promoted to the rank of vice admiral (zhongjiang) in June 2019.

Career
After graduating from Dalian Naval Academy, he was assigned to the North Sea Fleet, he worked there until 1990, while he was transferred to the National Defence Scientific Industry Council in Beijing. Beginning in 2003, he served in several posts in the PLA General Equipment Department, including chief, deputy director, and director. Feng attained the rank of rear admiral (shaojiang) in July 2005. In December 2014 he was appointed director of the Co-ordination and Planning Branch of the PLA General Equipment Department, he remained in that position until July 2016, when he was promoted to deputy head of the Department of Equipment Development of the Central Military Commission. In August 2017 he was appointed deputy commander of the People's Liberation Army Navy.

References

1962 births
People from Chaohu
Living people
Dalian Naval Academy alumni
People's Liberation Army generals from Anhui
People's Liberation Army Navy admirals